Ciprian Șandru (born 27 February 1991) is a Romanian handballer who plays for Dinamo București and the Romania national team.

References

1991 births
Living people
People from Sighișoara
Romanian male handball players
CS Dinamo București (men's handball) players